The 1986 Stanley Cup playoffs, the playoff tournament of the National Hockey League (NHL) began on April 9, after the conclusion of the 1985–86 NHL season. The playoffs concluded on May 24 with the champion Montreal Canadiens defeating the Calgary Flames 4–1 to win the Stanley Cup.

This was the last time to date that all active Canadian teams have qualified in the same season and also the second time that all seven active teams at the time qualified, the first occurring three years earlier. The 1986 playoffs saw three first place teams eliminated in the opening round and the fourth, Edmonton, bowed out in the second. This was the last time that all six Sutter brothers participated in the playoffs in the same year.

In the first round, six of the eight series ended in a three-game sweep. The only two first-round series that did not were the Rangers over the Flyers, and the Blues over the North Stars, both going the full five games.

The Montreal Canadiens decided to go with a rookie goaltender by the name of Patrick Roy. This decision proved to be a good one just like when the Canadiens rode rookie goalie Ken Dryden to a Stanley Cup championship in 1971. In the Final, the Canadiens beat the Calgary Flames, who were also riding a rookie netminder, Mike Vernon.  Patrick Roy won the Conn Smythe Trophy as the playoff MVP and had a sparkling 1.92 goals against average along with 15 wins. St. Louis forwards Doug Gilmour and Bernie Federko led the playoffs in scoring with 21 points despite missing the finals; this feat was not repeated until 1999.

The 1986 playoffs marked the first time that all four former WHA teams made the playoffs in the same year. This would happen again the following year and in 1999, by which time 3 of those teams had moved, the Quebec Nordiques to Denver, the Winnipeg Jets to Phoenix, and the Hartford Whalers to Raleigh.

Playoff seeds

The following teams qualified for the playoffs:

Prince of Wales Conference

Adams Division
 Quebec Nordiques, Adams Division champions – 92 points
 Montreal Canadiens – 87 points
 Boston Bruins – 86 points
 Hartford Whalers – 84 points

Patrick Division
 Philadelphia Flyers, Patrick Division champions, Prince of Wales Conference regular season champions – 110 points
 Washington Capitals – 107 points
 New York Islanders – 90 points
 New York Rangers – 78 points

Clarence Campbell Conference

Norris Division
 Chicago Black Hawks, Norris Division champions – 86 points
 Minnesota North Stars – 85 points
 St. Louis Blues – 83 points
 Toronto Maple Leafs – 57 points

Smythe Division
 Edmonton Oilers, Smythe Division champions, Clarence Campbell Conference regular season champions, Presidents' Trophy winners – 119 points
 Calgary Flames – 89 points
 Winnipeg Jets – 59 points (26 wins)
 Vancouver Canucks – 59 points (23 wins)

Playoff bracket

Division Semifinals

Prince of Wales Conference

(A1) Quebec Nordiques vs. (A4) Hartford Whalers

This was the first playoff series between these two teams.

This was Hartford's lone playoff series victory in their NHL history prior to moving to Carolina.

(A2) Montreal Canadiens vs. (A3) Boston Bruins

This was the twenty-first playoff matchup and the third of nine consecutive playoff meetings between these two teams, with Montreal winning eighteen of the twenty previous series. Montreal won the previous year in five games.

(P1) Philadelphia Flyers vs. (P4) New York Rangers

This was the seventh playoff series meeting between these two teams. Both teams have split their previous six meetings. Philadelphia won last year's Patrick Division Semifinals in a three-game sweep.

(P2) Washington Capitals vs. (P3) New York Islanders

This was the fourth playoff series between these two teams. New York Islanders won all three previous meetings over the past three seasons. New York won last year's Patrick Division Semifinals 3–2.

Clarence Campbell Conference

(N1) Chicago Black Hawks vs. (N4) Toronto Maple Leafs

This was the seventh playoff series meeting between these two teams. Toronto won four of the previous six meetings. Their last meeting was in the 1967 Stanley Cup Semifinals, in which Toronto won in six games.

(N2) Minnesota North Stars vs. (N3) St. Louis Blues

This was the seventh playoff series meeting between these two teams. Both teams split their previous six series. Minnesota won last year's Norris Division Semifinals in a three-game sweep.

(S1) Edmonton Oilers vs. (S4) Vancouver Canucks

This was the first playoff series between these two teams.

(S2) Calgary Flames vs. (S3) Winnipeg Jets

This was the second playoff series between these two teams. This was a rematch of last year's Smythe Division Semifinals, in which Winnipeg won 3–1.

Division Finals

Prince of Wales Conference

(A2) Montreal Canadiens vs. (A4) Hartford Whalers

This was the second playoff series between these two teams. Montreal won the only previous meeting in a three-game sweep in the 1980 Preliminary Round.

The upstart Whalers pushed the eventual Stanley Cup Champions to the limit before falling.  Claude Lemieux scored the series-winning overtime goal for Montreal.

(P2) Washington Capitals vs. (P4) New York Rangers

This was the first playoff series between these two teams.

Clarence Campbell Conference

(N3) St. Louis Blues vs. (N4) Toronto Maple Leafs

This was the first playoff series between these two teams.

(S1) Edmonton Oilers vs. (S2) Calgary Flames

This was the third playoff series meeting between these two teams. Edmonton won both previous meetings, including their most recent meeting in seven games in the 1984 Smythe Division Finals.

The deciding goal of game seven between the Oilers and Flames was scored five minutes into the third period when Edmonton's Steve Smith attempted a cross-ice pass from the side of his own net and the puck struck goaltender Grant Fuhr's leg and went into the Edmonton goal. This goal is significant because it eliminated the Oilers from the playoffs and prevented them from possibly winning a third straight Stanley Cup. To date this is the Flames' only playoff series victory over the Oilers.

Conference Finals

Prince of Wales Conference Final

(A2) Montreal Canadiens vs. (P4) New York Rangers

This series is best remembered for the third game, in which the Rangers badly outshot the Habs, but were stymied by Patrick Roy.  Another Montreal rookie, Claude Lemieux, scored in overtime—his second overtime goal of the playoffs.

Clarence Campbell Conference Final

(S2) Calgary Flames vs. (N3) St. Louis Blues

In Game 6, the Flames led 4–1 after two periods and 5–2 early in the third, but the Blues came back to tie it and then won on an overtime goal by Doug Wickenheiser.  In Game 7, the Flames were up 2–0 before the Blues scored in the third to cut the lead in half.  There wouldn't be another comeback, though, as Mike Vernon and the Flames withstood a late assault to advance to their first Stanley Cup Final.

Stanley Cup Finals 

This was the first playoff series between these two teams. This was the Canadiens' thirty-second appearance in the Finals, while the Flames were making their first appearance in the Finals. Montreal had most recently won the Stanley Cup in 1979. The Flames became the first team to represent Calgary in the Finals since the 1923–24 Calgary Tigers who were defeated by the same Montreal Canadiens.

In game two Montreal's Brian Skrudland set an NHL and Stanley Cup Finals record for the quickest overtime goal in history, scoring just nine seconds into overtime to win the game for Montreal.

Player statistics

Skaters
These are the top ten skaters based on points.

Goaltenders
This is a combined table of the top five goaltenders based on goals against average and the top five goaltenders based on save percentage, with at least 420 minutes played. The table is sorted by GAA, and the criteria for inclusion are bolded.

See also
List of Stanley Cup champions

References

playoffs
Stanley Cup playoffs